The Fortress of Van (Armenian: Վանի Բերդ, also known as Van Citadel;) is a massive stone fortification built by the ancient kingdom of Urartu during the 9th to 7th centuries BC, and is the largest example of its kind. It overlooks the ruins of Tushpa, the ancient Urartian capital during the 9th century, which was centered upon the steep-sided bluff where the fortress now sits. A number of similar fortifications were built throughout the Urartian kingdom, usually cut into hillsides and outcrops in places where modern-day Armenia, Turkey and Iran meet. Successive groups such as the Medes, Achaemenids, Armenians, Parthians, Romans, Sassanid Persians, Byzantines, Arabs, Seljuks, Safavids, Afsharids, Ottomans and Russians each controlled the fortress at one time or another. The ancient fortress is located just west of Van and east of Lake Van in the Van Province of Turkey.

Silva Tipple New Lake led an American expedition to the ruins in 1938-40.  Most of the finds and field records from this were lost in the sinking of the S.S. Athenia in 1940.

The lower parts of the walls of Van Citadel were constructed of unmortared basalt, while the rest was built from mud bricks. 

Such fortresses were used for regional control, rather than as a defense against foreign armies. The ruins of this fortress sit outside the modern city of Van, where they support walls built in the medieval era.

The “Royal Stable” 
At the Van Citadel, there is a “royal stable” (Siršini) of the dimensions of 20m length, 9m width and 2,5m height, carved in rock. Oxen and sheep were held here to be sacrificed for the Urartian gods, according to the inscriptions discovered at the location.

Achaemenid inscription

A stereotyped trilingual inscription of Xerxes the Great from the 5th century BC is inscribed upon a smoothed section of the rock face, some 20 meters (60 feet) above the ground near the fortress. The niche was originally carved out by Xerxes' father, King Darius, but left the surface blank. The inscription survives in near perfect condition and is divided into three columns of 27 lines written in (from left to right) Old Persian, Elamite, and Babylonian.

Gallery

References

External links 
 Cuneiform Inscription at Van
 Extensive picture site of the Kale area and the old town

Archaeological sites in Eastern Anatolia
Archaeology of the Achaemenid Empire
Castles in Turkey
Van, Turkey
Urartian cities
Castles in Van Province
World Heritage Tentative List for Turkey